Aleksandr Guzov (born 24 June 1975) is a Belarusian wrestler. He competed at the 1996 Summer Olympics and the 2000 Summer Olympics.

References

 

1975 births
Living people
Belarusian male sport wrestlers
Olympic wrestlers of Belarus
Wrestlers at the 1996 Summer Olympics
Wrestlers at the 2000 Summer Olympics
Sportspeople from Gomel